James Patrick McGranery (July 8, 1895 – December 23, 1962) was a United States representative from Pennsylvania, a United States district judge of the United States District Court for the Eastern District of Pennsylvania and Attorney General of the United States.

Education and career

Born in Philadelphia, Pennsylvania, the son of Patrick McGranery, and Bridget (née Gallagher), both Irish immigrants, McGranery attended parochial schools and graduated from Roman Catholic High School in 1916 and Maher Preparatory School. He was in the United States Army Air Corps as an observation pilot and as an adjutant in the 111th Infantry Regiment from 1917 to 1919. He received a Bachelor of Laws from Temple University Beasley School of Law in 1928 and was admitted to the Pennsylvania bar the same year. He entered the private practice of law in Philadelphia from 1928 to 1937. He was a member of the Democratic State Committee from 1928 to 1932. He was an unsuccessful candidate for District Attorney of Philadelphia County in 1931 and for election to the 74th United States Congress in 1934. He served as Chairman of the Registration Commission of the City of Philadelphia in 1935. He was a United States representative from Pennsylvania from 1937 to 1943. He was admitted to practice before the Supreme Court of the United States in 1939. He was an assistant to the United States Attorney General in the United States Department of Justice in Washington, D.C., from 1943 to 1946.

Congressional service

McGranery was elected as a Democrat to the 75th United States Congress and to the three succeeding Congresses and served from January 3, 1937, until his resignation on November 17, 1943, to become an assistant to the United States Attorney General.

Federal judicial service

McGranery was nominated by President Harry S. Truman on July 31, 1946, to a seat on the United States District Court for the Eastern District of Pennsylvania vacated by Judge Harry Ellis Kalodner. He was confirmed by the United States Senate on July 31, 1946, and received his commission on August 7, 1946. He took the oath of office on October 9, 1946. His service was terminated on May 26, 1952, due to his resignation.

Post judicial service

McGranery was the Attorney General of the United States from May 27, 1952 to January 20, 1953. McGranery revoked the re-entry permit of Charlie Chaplin, when he was accused of Communist sympathies. He returned to the private practice of law in Washington, D.C., from 1954 until his death.

Death

McGranery died on December 23, 1962, in Palm Beach, Florida. He was interred in Arlington National Cemetery in Fort Myer, Virginia.

References

External links

 
 Retrieved on 2008-02-10
Profile at Truman Library 
Arlington National Cemetery

1895 births
1962 deaths
United States Army Air Service pilots of World War I
Burials at Arlington National Cemetery
American people of Irish descent
Politicians from Philadelphia
United States Attorneys General
United States Army officers
Judges of the United States District Court for the Eastern District of Pennsylvania
United States district court judges appointed by Harry S. Truman
20th-century American judges
Temple University Beasley School of Law alumni
Truman administration cabinet members
20th-century American politicians
Democratic Party members of the United States House of Representatives from Pennsylvania